The 20 kilometre race walk is an Olympic athletics event that is competed by both men and women. The racewalking event is competed as a road race. Athletes must always keep in contact with the ground and the supporting leg must remain straight until the raised leg passes it.

World records

The men's world record for the 20 km race walk is held by Yusuke Suzuki, who walked 1:16:36 at the Asian Race Walking Championships in his home town of Nomi, Japan. Suzuki's new World Record came exactly one week after Yohann Diniz's mark who walked a then record time of 1:17:02 in Arles at the 2015 French championships. The women's world record of 1:24:38 was set by Liu Hong of China. Russian Elena Lashmanova, has served a previous ban for doping, currently holds a quicker time of 1:23:39 which is also the European record, but it has never been ratified as a world record.

All-time top 25

Men
Correct as of February 2022.

Notes
Below is a list of other times equal or superior to 1:17:47:
Toshikazu Yamanishi also walked 1:17:20 (2021), 1:17:36 (2020), 1:17:41 (2018, 2019).
Yohann Diniz also walked 1:17:24 (2015), 1:17:43 (2012).
Vladimir Kanaykin also walked 1:17:36 (2007).
Yusuke Suzuki also walked 1:17:47 (2019).

Women
Correct as of March 2021.

1 : These times were achieved without the presence of international judges to officiate the competition and/or post-race doping tests, thus making them invalid for world record status. However, they are accepted as personal best marks for those athletes.

Notes
Below is a list of other times equal or superior to 1:26:14:
Liu Hong also walked 1:24:38 (2015), 1:25:56 (2016, 2019), 1:25:46 (2012), 1:26:00 (2012).
Elena Lashmanova also walked 1:24:58 (2016), 1:25:02 (2012), 1:25:18 (2017), 1:25:41 (2021), 1:25:49 (2013).
Olga Kaniskina also walked 1:25:11 (2008), 1:25:42 (2008), 1:25:54 (2016), 1:26:02 (2006).
Vera Sokolova also walked 1:25:26 (2009), 1:25:35 (2010), 1:25:38 (2015), 1:26:00 (2013).
Anisya Kirdyapkina also walked 1:25:26 (2009), 1:25:30 (2008), 1:25:59 (2013).
Elmira Alembekova also walked 1:25:27 (2012).
Yang Jiayu also walked 1:25:34 (2019).
Shenjie Qieyang also walked 1:25:16 (2012), 1:25:37 (2019).
Olimpiada Ivanova also walked 1:25:41 (2005), 1:26:08 (2000).
Lü Xiuzhi also walked 1:22:51 (2021).

The following athletes have had their performances (inside 1:26:14) annulled due to doping offence:

Olympic medalists

Men

Women

World Championships medalists

Men

Women

Season's bests

Men

Women

External links
IAAF list of 20-kilometres-race-walk records in XML

References

Racewalking distances
Summer Olympic disciplines in athletics